John Shivers is a former member of the Ohio House of Representatives, serving Columbiana County from 1983 to 1990.

Prior to his time in the legislature, he served as the clerk as the Columbiana Court of Common Pleas, and as the Assistant County Prosecutor.  He was an attorney.

References

Democratic Party members of the Ohio House of Representatives
Living people
People from Columbiana, Ohio
Year of birth missing (living people)